Kathryn Paige Northcutt (born February 15, 1968), née Kathryn Paige Zemina, is an American former competition swimmer who was an Olympic bronze medalist.

Early years 

Zemina was born in Boynton Beach, Florida.  She attended Fort Lauderdale High School in Fort Lauderdale, Florida, where her mother was an English teacher, and she swam for coach Jack Nelson's Fort Lauderdale Flying L's high school swim team.  She was a five-time Florida state high school champion—three times in the 100-yard freestyle, and twice in the 200-yard freestyle.  She set the national high school record of 1:48.60 seconds in the 200-yard freestyle in 1984.  Zemina was also a member of a national record-setting team in the 200-meter freestyle relay (short course) in 1985.  She graduated from high school in 1985.

College swimming career 

She accepted an athletic scholarship to attend the University of Florida in Gainesville, Florida, where she swam for coach Randy Reese's Florida Gators swimming and diving team in National Collegiate Athletic Association (NCAA) competition from 1986 to 1989.  During her career as a Gator swimmer, Zemina was a five-time NCAA champion, including the 4x200-yard freestyle relay (1986, 1988, 1989), the 4x100-yard freestyle relay (1988), and the 4x50-yard medley relay (1989).  She also received twelve All-American honors as a college swimmer.

International swimming career 

Zemina competed for United States national teams at international swimming tournaments in Germany (1983), Sweden (1984), Japan (1985), the Soviet Union (1986) and South Korea (1988).  She became the center of a controversy at the 1985 World University Games in Kobe, Japan, when two winning U.S. relay teams of which she was a member were disqualified because she was too young to compete.  Zemina, who had turned 17 on February 15, missed the January 1 cutoff by several weeks, and the error was overlooked by USA Swimming authorities.

At the 1986 Goodwill Games in Moscow, Russia, she won two gold medals as a member of winning U.S. relay team in the 4×100-meter freestyle and the 4×200-meter freestyle, as well as bronze medal in the individual 100-meter freestyle.  At the 1988 Summer Olympics in Seoul, South Korea, Zemina swam for the third-place U.S. team in the preliminary heats of the women's 4×100-meter freestyle relay; together with Mary Wayte, Mitzi Kremer, Laura Walker, Dara Torres and Jill Sterkel, she received a bronze medal.

See also 

 List of Olympic medalists in swimming (women)
 List of University of Florida alumni
 List of University of Florida Olympians

References 

1968 births
Living people
American female freestyle swimmers
Florida Gators women's swimmers
Olympic bronze medalists for the United States in swimming
Sportspeople from Boynton Beach, Florida
Swimmers at the 1988 Summer Olympics
Medalists at the 1988 Summer Olympics
Universiade medalists in swimming
Universiade gold medalists for the United States
Goodwill Games medalists in swimming
Medalists at the 1985 Summer Universiade
Competitors at the 1986 Goodwill Games